We Start Fires were a female-fronted punk-pop rock 'n' roll band formed in Darlington in 2002. They consist of Becky Stefani (vocals and guitar), Melissa Marx (synths and vocals), Nikki Vaughan (bass and vocals), and Becky's younger brother Ashley Wade (drums).

Their first limited edition single, "Strut", received radio airplay from Zane Lowe, Rob Da Bank, Steve Lamacq, Marc Riley and John Kennedy. John Peel mentioned them in his book Margrave Of The Marshes.

They performed at SXSW, for which they were filmed as the subjects of a documentary film later shown on the BBC's The Culture Show.

Discography

Albums
Caught Redhanded (Head Girl Records) – 2004
We Start Fires (Hot Noise Records) – 1 October 2007

Singles/EP’s
"How to Be a Lady" (EP, Head Girl Records) – 2002
"Strut" (Marquis Cha Cha Records) – August 2005
"Hot Metal" (Marquis Cha Cha Records) – January 2006
"Magazine" (Hot Noise Records) – 28 May 2007
"Play You" (Hot Noise Records) – 20 August 2007
"Let's Get Our Hands Dirty" (Hot Noise Records) – 22 October 2007

Compilation contributions
"Hot Metal" - What We All Want (Dance To The Radio Records) – 27 February 2006

References

2002 establishments in England
English electronic rock musical groups
English pop punk groups
Musical groups established in 2002
Musical groups from County Durham